Kuh Kan-e Olya (also Romanized as Kūh Kan-e ‘Olyā; also known as Kūh Kan-e Bālā) is a village in Ab Bar Rural District, in the Central District of Tarom County, Zanjan Province, Iran. At the 2006 census, its population was 452, in 104 families.

References 

Populated places in Tarom County